Wiston  may refer to the following places in the United Kingdom:

 Wiston, Pembrokeshire, Wales
 Wiston Castle
 Wiston, South Lanarkshire, Scotland
 Wiston, Suffolk, England
 Wiston, West Sussex, England
 Wiston House